Clearwater River Dene Band 223 is an Indian reserve of the Clearwater River Dene Nation in Saskatchewan. It is 24 kilometres northwest of Buffalo Narrows. In the 2016 Canadian Census, it recorded a population of 35 living in 10 of its 11 total private dwellings.

References

Indian reserves in Saskatchewan
Division No. 18, Saskatchewan